The gens Dellia was a plebeian family of equestrian rank at ancient Rome.  It is known chiefly from a single individual, Quintus Dellius, an eques, who served successively with Dolabella, Cassius, and Marcus Antonius.  Shortly before the Battle of Actium, having been sent to collect auxiliaries, he deserted to Octavian, perhaps motivated by his fear of Cleopatra, whom he had offended.  He wrote a history of the war against the Parthians, with whom he had fought under Antonius.  Although the history is entirely lost, it is believed to be the source for Plutarch's account of that war.  Dellius is probably the same person to whom Horace dedicated the third ode of his second book.

See also
 List of Roman gentes

References

Roman gentes